Belize–Taiwan relations or Belize–China relations are foreign relations between Belize and Republic of China (Taiwan). Bilateral relations between the two countries have been maintained since 1989. Belize has adhered to the One China policy where it is one of the few countries that recognizes the ROC government as the sole legitimate government of "China" instead of the People's Republic of China (PRC) on the mainland.

History
William Quinto, a Belizean businessman of Chinese descent and a supporter of Belize's People's United Party, began lobbying then-Prime Minister George Price via his mutual acquaintance Said Musa for Belize to establish relations with Taiwan in the 1980s. Then-Taiwanese ambassador to Guatemala Gene Loh came to Belize in May 1984 and met with Quinto and Price to discuss the possibility of establishing relations, but Guatemalan leader Rodolfo Lobos Zamora objected, and after Manuel Esquivel of the Belizean opposition United Democratic Party took power in the election late that year, the plans were put aside. In the coming years, Quinto would put up the funds for Musa (by then Minister of Education), Minister of Foreign Affairs Harry Courtney, and Vice Minister Robert Leslie to go to Japan and Hong Kong in order to meet with Loh again. However, it would not be until after the 1989 election when the PUP regained power that Belize and Taiwan established relations. At that point, Belize only had three overseas missions, in London, Washington DC, and at the United Nations in New York City; Musa, who by then had become Minister of Foreign Affairs, told Quinto that if he did not go to Taipei to fill the position of ambassador, there would be no one else to take the job, and thus he went. Quinto remained Belize's ambassador to Taiwan until 2008, when he retired. His subordinate, chargé d'affaires Efrain R. Novelo, was promoted to full ambassadorial rank to replace him.

In 2021, Taiwan and Belize signed a mutual assistance treaty that would serve as a framework to legal cooperation between the two countries.

Ambassadors
From Belize to the Republic of China:
 William Quinto (until 2008)
 Diane Haylock (October 2016 to present)

From the Republic of China to Belize:
 Charles Liu (November 2016 to present)

References

External links
 Embassy of the Republic of China in Belize

 
Taiwan
Bilateral relations of Taiwan